Henry Lizardlover (born March 27, 1954, as Henry Schifberg) is a herpetoculturist, writer, and photographer who changed his last name to "Lizardlover" in 1986 as a symbol of his appreciation for the reptiles.

Living nearby Hollywood, California, Lizardlover shares his home with a group of between 30 and 50 different lizards, most of which are iguanas.  Since 1982, Lizardlover has been photographing "family photos" of his lizards in humorous human-like poses.      Photo calendars and cards are published featuring the lizards.  Lizardlover has made appearances on Animal Planet, Now with Tom Brokaw, the short-lived late-night program The Chevy Chase Show, and what is described as "Univision's version of Ripley's Believe it or Not".   Lizardlover and his iguanas are featured in a 2006 Ripley's Believe It or Not! book titled Ripley's Believe It or Not! Expect...The Unexpected. He was a contestant in a One-on-One round of a 1990 episode of To Tell The Truth, and was a contestant on the 2006 revival of I've Got A Secret.

Lizardlover authored his first guide to reptile care, the Iguana Owner's Manual in 1992; it is now in its third edition.  He and his reptile family were followed extensively in the 2002 Nature documentary film "Reptiles: Snakes and Lizards".  Lizardlover continues to write and contribute to books on the care of reptiles.

References
 "Reptiles: Snakes and Lizards", Nature, 2002.  (PBS)
 Van Houten, Carolynne.  "Become a True Believer - Ripley's talk to cover the wildly unusual museum creator", Ocean County Observer.  August 20, 2006.
 Filipek, Suzan.  "Henry Lizardlover", Larchmont Chronicle.  September 2, 2003.
 "Iguana images by Henry Lizardlover", Today's Planet.
 Lizardlover, Henry; Rosenthal, Karen L.  The Iguana - An Owner's Guide to a Happy Healthy Pet'', Howell Books.  July 1, 1996.

External links
 henrylizardlover.com official website
 Henry Lizardlover on IMDb

1954 births
Living people
American photographers
Artists from California